Édouard Jeandet (8 March 1902–22 September 1958) was a French rower. He competed in the men's eight event at the 1928 Summer Olympics.

References

External links
 
 

1902 births
1958 deaths
French male rowers
Olympic rowers of France
Rowers at the 1928 Summer Olympics